Maghreb Emballage (Arabic: التغليف المغاربي) is a manufacturer in the paper and packaging industry, founded in 1948 and based in Oran, Algeria.

Maghreb Emballage has more than 700 employees, spread over three production sites on a surface of 50,000 m2 in Oran and its suburbs. It covers the whole national territory and ensures a daily service of proximity.

References

External links
Official website

Companies based in Oran
Manufacturing companies established in 1948
Algerian brands